Songs of Armor and Devotion is the ninth studio album from the American punk band Strung Out. It was released on August 9, 2019 through Fat Wreck Chords on CD and LP. Songs of Armor and Devotion is the only album to feature drummer RJ Shankle, prior to his departure in July 2022. It was generally received well by critics. Shortly after, two collaboration beers was released with Lucky Luke Brewing Company (Palmdale, CA) in conjunction with the album release. One named “Armor” an IPA and “Devotion” a citrus wheat beer.

Background 
Fat Wreck Chords announced the album on June 4, 2019, after frontman Jason Cruz already revealed the name of the new album, Songs of Armor and Devotion, on May 15 on Episode 15 of the Dying Scene Podcast. A song on the new album, "Daggers", was released the same day. A US tour with The Casualties in the fall of 2019 was announced on June 11.

A new song called "Under the Western Sky" was released with an accompanying music video on July 10. The entire album was made available for streaming on August 7, two days before the official release.

Track listing 
 "Rebels and Saints" - 3:54
 "Daggers" - 4:06
 "Ulysses" - 4:12
 "Under the Western Sky" - 3:51
 "Monuments" - 2:45
 "White Girls" - 2:42
 "Demons" - 3:38
 "Hammer Down" - 3:07
 "Disappearing City" - 2:49
 "Politics of Sleep" - 3:10
 "Diamonds and Gold" - 3:11
 "Strange Notes" - 2:45
 "Bloody Knuckles" - 3:45

Performers 
 Chris Aiken - bass
 RJ Shankle - drums
 Jake Kiley - guitar
 Rob Ramos - guitar, vocals
 Jason Cruz - vocals

Charts

References 

Strung Out albums
2019 albums
Fat Wreck Chords albums